During the FINA World Aquatics Championships, athletes whose governing body have been suspended are still allowed to compete under the FINA flag with the "country" designation as "Suspended Member Federation". In 2015 the Sri Lankan federation was suspended, but they competed as independent athletes under the FINA code. Since 2017 Kuwait and Kenya have sent participants to the Aquatics Championships under the SMF code.

2017 World Aquatics Championships

Due to the suspension of the Kuwait Swimming Association, Kuwaiti athletes participated as independent athletes at the 2017 World Aquatics Championships. The competition took place in Budapest, Hungary from 14 July to 30 July. Two male swimmers participated in three different events.

2022 World Aquatics Championships

Two athletes from Kenya competed at the 2022 World Aquatics Championships in Budapest, Hungary from 18 June to 3 July. Each swimmer participated in two events.
Men

Women

See also
FINA athletes at the World Aquatics Championships

References

Nations at the 2017 World Aquatics Championships
Nations at the 2022 World Aquatics Championships
FINA Independent athletes
Kenya at the World Aquatics Championships
Kuwait at the World Aquatics Championships